Drying agent may refer to:

 Desiccant, which absorbs water or moisture from its vicinity
 Oil drying agent, which speed up the hardening of oils, often used in painting